was a town located in Mihara District, Hyōgo Prefecture, Japan.

As of 2003, the town had an estimated population of 12,004 and a density of 214.40 persons per km². The total area was 55.99 km².

On January 11, 2005, Seidan, along with the towns of Mihara, Midori and Nandan (all from Mihara District), was merged to create the city of Minamiawaji.

External links
 Seidan Town Society of Commerce and Industry

Dissolved municipalities of Hyōgo Prefecture
Minamiawaji, Hyōgo